Founded in 1854, the Department of Architecture (D-ARCH) at ETH Zurich in Switzerland is an architecture school in Zürich, providing education in the fields of architecture, landscape architecture, urban planning, and urban design. It has around 1,900 students and 350 staff, and an annual budget of CHF 40 million.

History

In 1854 there was a Parliamentary resolution establishing a federal polytechnic school in Zurich, on the basis of the 1848 constitution

15 October 1855	Opening of the ‘Swiss Federal Polytechnic School’ with six divisions, including the Engineering School and – although not originally envisaged – the ‘Building School’

Gottfried Semper, not only a successful architect of monumental buildings but also an established theorist and teacher, was appointed the first professor and director of the Building School. His educational model of the atelier libre, oriented on the École des Beaux-Arts in Paris, conflicts with the polytechnic school's profile, which is chiefly practical and technically oriented. The pupils worked in the drafting room on practical assignments, competed in rivalries and contributed to Sempers's own projects.
Semper succeeded in changing the title of the degree from ‘master builder’ to ‘architect’, but he nonetheless failed to extend the three-year duration of studies.

1857	       The second professorial chair, focused on civil engineering, is filled by Ernst Gladbach

1864 The Building School relocates to the newly built polytechnic, erected according to plans by Semper, where it occupies the ground floor of the north and west wings

1866	       Maximum of 52 students (consistently below 100 until 1914)

1871 Semper's departure. Julius Stadler and George Lasius continue to teach in his spirit, but the school is in danger of ossifying

1881 With the appointment of Friedrich Bluntschli – an esteemed architect in the tradition of Semper, albeit far more formalistic – the instruction focuses entirely on the Renaissance vocabulary

1882 The studies are extended to seven semesters

1899	       The Building School is renamed as the ‘Architecture School’ and again in 1924 as the ‘Architecture Division’

1900	       Gustav Gull, Zurich's municipal architect, is appointed as professor. Reform architecture arrives, and the differentiation between monumental and civil architecture becomes obsolete. Gull introduces the discipline of ‘urban design’ into the curriculum.

1904 The diploma thesis is separated from the seven semesters of the study programme

1911	       The polytechnic is renamed as the ‘Swiss Federal Institute of Technology Zurich’

1914 With Bluntschli's retirement, instruction in the classical vocabulary is largely curtailed, finally ending in 1925 with the appointment of Friedrich Hess as the successor to Lasius.

1915 Karl Moser is appointed as professor
Gull and Moser increasingly advocate two conflicting architectural views; Gull is considered regressive and Moser, by contrast, is seen as progressive – and as one of the forefathers of modern architecture.

1917	       By reorganising the subjects of structural mechanics, structural analysis and engineering design, the division of responsibilities between engineers and architects we commonly know today is firmly established.

1929	       After Moser's retirement (1928) as well as Gull's restructuring and the reformation of the architecture division by his successors, Otto Rudolf Salvisberg and William Dunkel: To avoid the coexistence of competing architectural ideas, the instruction is divided into a succession of two-semester courses, each of which is overseen by a single professor and which comprise tasks that are progressively more complex. The curriculum is given a stronger design orientation, with structural analysis and building construction are closely aligned.

1931 Work experience is anchored in the curriculum by implementing a mandatory six-month internship (one year since 1945)

1941	       Hans Hofmann follows O. R. Salvisberg.

1959	Over 400 students enrolled. William Dunkel retires.
The teaching is reorganised: The foundation course developed substantially by Bernhard Hoesli conveys the principles of modern architecture in a systematic way, thus making it is possible to simultaneously permit differing tendencies and understandings of (modern) architecture in the upper-level courses.
The teaching staff is expanded, and now includes visiting professors like Georges Candilis, Ralph Erskine, Jørn Utzon and Aldo Rossi (1972–1974), whose design methodologies have been influential until very recently.

1960	       The duration of study is extended to eight semesters (plus diploma thesis)

The architecture division develops an increasingly more scientific orientation
New subjects, such as sociology (1962, Lucius Burckhardt), are introduced
The teaching principles for architectural design are systematised by Hoesli (the teaching principles for construction are later systematised by Heinz Ronner and those for design by Peter Jenny)
Research institutes established:
– Institute for Local, Regional and National Planning ORL (1961; reorganised in 2002 as the Network City and Landscape NSL)
– Institute for the History and Theory of Architecture gta (1967)
– Institute for Building Research HBF (1969; abolished 1985)
– Institute for Building Technology HBT (1972; since 2009: Institute of Technology in Architecture ITA)
– Institute of Historic Building Research ID (1972; now: Institute of Historic Building Research and Conservation IDB)

1968 	Additional space is taken up in the so-called Globus Provisorium at the Bahnhofbrücke Zürich

1972 	A two-year rotation cycle is established for the dean

Mid-1970s Over 1000 students enrolled

1976	        Under great protest, the architecture division relocates to the ETH annex on the Hönggerberg campus

1980s	In light of the pluralism of international architecture and through ETH's own research, the supposedly clear profile of the school, based on modernism, is increasingly called into question. The stringent didactic concept of the foundation course at the beginning of the programme is fragmented.

The school, called the Department of Architecture since 1999, gains more autonomy. In accordance with the ETH's policies focused on international excellence, research takes on greater significance. This is reflected in the numerous publications issued by the chairs and institutes and in a significant increase in the number of doctorates.

2007 	Introduction of a six-semester bachelor programme and a four-semester master programme in compliance with standards defined by the Bologna Process

Lecturers

Current lecturers 
 Marc Angélil, Professor, Chair of Architecture and Design
 Philippe Block, Professor, Chair of Architecture and Structure
 Gion A. Caminada, Professor, Chair of Architecture and Design
 Jan Carmeliet, Professor, Chair of Building Physics
 Adam Caruso, Professor, Chair of Architecture and Technology
 François Charbonnet, Visiting Professor of Architectural Design
 Emanuel Christ, Assistant Professor of Architecture and Design
 Kees Christiaanse, Professor, Chair of Architecture and Urban Design
 Andrea Deplazes, Professor, Chair of Architecture and Technology
 Roger Diener, Professor, Chair of Architecture and Design
 Benjamin Dillenburger, Professor, Chair of Digital Building Technologies
 Dietmar Eberle, Professor, Chair of Architecture and Design
 Tom Emerson, Professor, Chair of Architecture and Construction
 Christoph Gantenbein, Assistant Professor of Architecture and Design
 Annette Gigon, Professor, Chair of Architecture and Construction
 Christophe Girot, Professor, Chair of Landscape Architecture
 Fabio Gramazio, Professor, Chair of Architecture and Digital Fabrication
 Mike Guyer, Professor, Chair of Architecture and Construction
 Uta Hassler, Professor, Chair of Historic Building Research and Conservation
 Dirk Hebel, Assistant Professorship of Architecture and Urban Design
 Mathias Heinz, Visiting Professor of Architectural Design
 Patrick Heiz, Visiting Professor of Architectural Design
 Jacques Herzog, Professor, Chair of Architecture and Design, Pritzker Prize
 Ludger Hovestadt, Professor, Chair of Computer-Aided Architectural Design
 Christian Kerez, Professor, Chair of Architecture and Design
 Hubert Klumpner, Professor, Chair of Architecture and Urban Design
 Matthias Kohler, Professor, Chair of Architecture and Digital Fabrication
 Alexander Lehnerer, Assistant Professorship of Architecture and Urban Design
 Hansjürg Leibundgut, Professor, Chair of Building Systems
 Winy Maas, Visiting Professor of Architectural Design
 Peter Märkli, Professor, Chair of Architecture and Technology
 Vittorio Magnago Lampugnani, Professor, Chair of the History of Urban Design
 Josep Lluis Mateo, Professor, Chair of Architecture and Design
 Beat Mathys, Visiting Professor of Architectural Design
 Marcel Meili, Professor, Chair of Architecture and Design
 Sacha Menz, Professor, Chair of Architecture and Building Process
 Pierre de Meuron, Professor, Chair of Architecture and Design, Pritzker Prize
 Ákos Moravánszky, Honorary Professor of Theory of Architecture
 Markus Peter, Professor, Chair of Architecture and Technology
 Karin Sander, Professor, Chair of Architecture and Art
 Wolfgang Schett, Professor, Chair of Architecture and Design
 Arno Schlüter, Assistant Professor of Architecture and Sustainable Building Technologies
 Christian Schmid, Honorary Professor of Sociology
 Gerhard Schmitt, Professor, Chair of Information Architecture
 Joseph Schwartz, Professor, Chair of Structural Design
 Miroslav Šik, Professor, Chair of Architecture and Design
 Annette Spiro, Professor, Chair of Architecture and Technology
 Laurent Stalder, Professor of Theory of Architecture
 Ursula Stücheli, Visiting Professor of Architectural Design
 Andreas Tönnesmann, Professor, Chair of the History of Art and Architecture
 Milica Topalovic, Assistant Professorship of Architecture and Territorial Planning
 Philip Ursprung, Professor, Chair of the History of Art and Architecture
 Günther Vogt, Professor, Chair of Landscape Architecture
 Stefan M. Holzer, Professor, Chair of Building Archaeology and Construction History
 Silke Langenberg, Professor, Chair of Construction Heritage and Preservation

Notable former lecturers
 Gottfried Semper, German architect (Professor at the ETH and Founder of the ETH)
 Aldo Rossi, Italian architect, (Professor at the ETH) Pritzker Prize
 Jørn Utzon, Danish architect, (Guest Professor at the ETH) Pritzker Prize
 Kazuyo Sejima, Japanese architect, (Design Studio at ETH)  SANAA Pritzker Prize
 Eduardo Souto de Moura, Portuguese architect, (Guest Professor at the ETH) Pritzker Prize
 Peter Eisenman, American architect, (Design Studio at ETH)
 Frank Gehry, American architect, (Design Studio at ETH), Pritzker Prize
 Dominique Perrault, French architect, (Design Studio at ETH)
 Daniel Libeskind, American architect, (Design Studio at ETH)
 Jacob Burckhardt, Swiss historian of art and culture (Professor at the ETH)
 Paul Feyerabend, Austrian philosopher of science (Professor at the ETH)
 Christian Menn, Swiss bridge designer (Professor at the ETH)
 Valerio Olgiati, Swiss architect, (Design Studio at ETH)
 Greg Lynn, American architect, (Design Studio at ETH)
 Giorgio Grassi, Italian architect, (Design Studio at ETH)
 Elia Zenghelis, Greek architect, (Design Studio at ETH)
 Hani Rashid, American architect Asymptote, (Design Studio)
 Hans Kollhoff, German architect, (Professor at the ETH)
 Philippe Rahm, Swiss architect, (Design Studio at ETH)
 Smiljan Radic, Chilean architect, (Design Studio at ETH)
 Dieter Kienast, Swiss landscape architect, (Professor at the ETH)
 Tony Fretton, British architect, (Design Studio at ETH)

Notable graduates 
 Hendrik Petrus Berlage, architect 
 Aldo van Eyck 
 Santiago Calatrava, architect 
 Max Frisch, architect 
 Jacques Herzog (also professor at the ETH, Pritzker Prize in 2001)
 Pierre de Meuron (also professor at the ETH, Pritzker Prize in 2001)
 Aldo Rossi, architect (professor at the ETH, Pritzker Prize in 1990)
 Bernard Tschumi, architect 
 Justus Dahinden 
 Konstantin Jovanović 
 Schak Bull, Norwegian architect 
 John Engh, Norwegian architect 
 Othmar Ammann, Swiss-American structural engineer 
 Karl Moser 
 Hans Benno Bernoulli 
 Bernhard Hoesli (also a professor at the ETH)
 William Lescaze 
 Christian Kerez (also a professor at the ETH)
 Werner M. Moser (also a professor at the ETH)
 Hans Auer 
 Alfred Friedrich Bluntschli 
 Livio Vacchini (also a professor at the ETH)
 Annette Gigon, Gigon/Guyer (also a professor at the ETH)
 Luigi Snozzi, Swiss architect

Institutes

 IEA - Institute of Design and Architecture
 GTA - Institute for the History and Theory of Architecture
 IDB - Institute for Preservation and Construction History (formerly Institute of Historic Building Research and Conservation)
 ITA - Institute of Technology in Architecture
 NSL - Network City and Landscape
LUS - Institute for Landscape and Urban Studies (formerly ILA - Institute for Landscape Architecture)
ISB – Institute for Urban Design
Contemporary City Institute - Studio Basel
 IDB - Institute of Historic Building Research and Conservation
 FCL - Future Cities Laboratory

Degrees 
The D-ARCH (Departement of Architecture), offers the following degrees:
 Bachelor of Science ETH in Architecture (BSc ETH Arch.)
 Master of Science ETH in Architecture (MSc ETH Arch.)
 Doctor of Sciences (Dr. sc. ETH Zürich)
 Master of Advanced Studies ETH in Landscape Architecture (MAS ETH LA)
 Master of Advanced Studies ETH in Urban Design (MAS ETH UD)
 Master of Advanced Studies ETH in Competence and Responsibility - Building Process (MAS ETH CRBP)
 Master of Advanced Studies ETH in Architecture:
 with specialisation in Computer Aided Architectural Design (MAS ETH ARCH/CAAD)
 with specialisation in City Building Typology (MAS ETH ARCH/CBT)
 with specialisation in Conservation Sciences (MAS ETH ARCH/CS)
 with specialisation in History and Theory of Architecture (MAS ETH ARCH/HTA)
 with specialisation in Sustainable Management of Man-made Resources (MAS ETH ARCH/SUMA)
 with specialisation in Tectonical Construction Systematics (MAS ETH ARCH/TCS)
 with specialisation in Housing (MAS ETH ARCH/Housing)

References

External links 
 ETH Zürich - D-ARCH website
 Future Cities Laboratory - Institute for sustainable urban development website

Architecture schools in Switzerland
ETH Zurich